Stephen Blair JP (21 March 1804 – 5 July 1870) was a British Conservative politician.

The first Conservative Mayor of Bolton, holding the post from 1845 to 1846, Blair was elected Conservative MP for Bolton at a by-election in 1848—caused by the death of William Bolling—and held the seat until 1852 when he was defeated.

Blair was a prominent Freemason rising to Provincial Grand Master.

Upon his death, Blair donated £30,000 to be used for the building and running of Blair Hospital — named after him — in Bolton.

See also
John Hick

References

External links
 

UK MPs 1847–1852
1804 births
1870 deaths
Conservative Party (UK) MPs for English constituencies